"Christmas Day" is a Christmas song by Michael W. Smith featuring Mandisa, from Smith's third Christmas album, It's a Wonderful Christmas (2007). In 2014 Smith remade this song for his fourth Christmas album The Spirit of Christmas (2014), this time featuring Jennifer Nettles.

Personnel

2007 Credits 
 Michael W. Smith – vocals, grand piano 
 Mandisa – vocals 
 David Hamilton – Hammond B3 organ, synthesizer, celeste, choir arrangements 
 Adam Lester – electric guitar 
 James Gregory – bass 
 Paul Leim – drums 
 Carl Marsh – orchestra arrangements 
 The London Session Orchestra – orchestra 
 Children's Choir – choir

2014 Credits 
 Michael W. Smith – vocals, grand piano 
 Jennifer Nettles – vocals
 David Hamilton – synthesizer, orchestra arrangements and conductor 
 Mark Baldwin – guitars 
 Chris Rodriguez – guitars 
 Craig Nelson – bass 
 Scott Williamson – drums 
 The London Session Orchestra – orchestra 
 Nashville Children's Choir – choir 
 Kyle Hankins – choir director

Charts

Weekly charts

References

2007 singles
2014 songs
American Christmas songs
Jennifer Nettles songs
Mandisa songs
Michael W. Smith songs
Songs written by Michael W. Smith
Sparrow Records singles
Songs written by Cindy Morgan (singer)